The Anzac Memorial  is a monument in Be'eri Forest, Negev, Israel, to the soldiers of the Australian and New Zealand armies who were killed in Palestine during World War I.

History
The acronym ANZAC stands for " Australian and New Zealand Army Corps", but now it is treated as a regular word.

It was designed by architect Yedidya Eisenshtat  (ידידיה איזנשטט), erected with the support of JNF Australia and Jewish communities in Australia and New Zealand. It was inaugurated in 1967 to mark the 50th anniversary of the Second Battle of Gaza in April 1917, in which Anzac forces took part, as part of the Sinai and Palestine campaign against the Ottoman Empire.  The place of the monument is in the area of both Gaza battles.

See also
Anzac Memorial, Australia

References

ANZAC
Military monuments and memorials in Israel
Negev
World War I
1967 establishments in Israel